= Cookie Allez =

French novelist (born c. 1948)

Cookie Allez (born c. 1948) is a French novelist.

== Early life ==
Cookie Allez was born circa 1948.

== Career ==
She has written seven novels.

Her second novel, La Soupière, talked about a mother and her son, who works as a clinical assistant.

In her seventh novel, Dominique, published in 2015, Allez writes about a child whose parents do not tell him if he is a boy or a girl to go along with the theory of gender studies.

== Bibliography ==
=== Novels ===
- Le Ventre du président (Paris: Éditions Buchet/Chastel, 2001, 121 pages).
- La Soupière (Paris, Éditions Buchet/Chastel, 2002, 139 pages).
- L’Arbre aux mensonges (Paris, Éditions Buchet/Chastel, 2003, 179 pages).
- Le Masque et les Plumes (Paris, Éditions Buchet/Chastel, 2005, 219 pages).
- Sans sucres ajoutés (Paris, Éditions Buchet/Chastel, 2006, 193 pages).
- Mobile de rupture (Paris, Éditions Buchet/Chastel, 2014, 234 pages).
- Dominique (Paris, Éditions Buchet/Chastel, 2015, 192 pages).

=== Essays ===
- Les Mots des familles (Paris, Éditions Buchet/Chastel, 2010, 233 pages).
- 200 expressions inventées en famille (Paris, Éditions Points, 2011, 203 pages).
